John O'Sullivan is an Australian engineer.

Fourier transforms and WiFi

In 1977, John O'Sullivan, while working at the Dwingeloo Radio Observatory in the Netherlands, co-authored a paper in the Journal of the Optical Society of America titled "Image sharpness, Fourier optics, and redundant-spacing interferometry" with J. P. Hamaker, and J. E. Noordam. In this paper, they presented a technique for sharpening and improving picture clarity in radio astronomy images.

In the early 1990s, O'Sullivan led a team at the CSIRO which patented, in 1996, the use of a related technique for reducing multipath interference of radio signals transmitted for computer networking. This technology is a part of all recent WiFi implementations. As of April 2012, the CSIRO has earned over $430 million in royalties and settlements arising from the use of this patent as part of the 802.11 standards with as much as a billion dollars expected after further lawsuits against other parties.

O'Sullivan joined Morse Micro in 2019. The Sydney-based company is developing a Wi-Fi microprocessor, now known as Wi-Fi HaLow.

Qualification
1974 Doctor of Philosophy (Electrical Engineering), Sydney University 
1969 Bachelor of Engineering, H1, University Medal, Sydney University
1969 Sydney University Sports Blue (Hockey)
1967 Bachelor of Science, Sydney University

Career 
2017 The IEEE Masaru Ibuka Consumer Electronics Award (with David Skellern) "for pioneering contributions to high-speed wireless LAN technology."
2013 M A Sargent Medal
2012 The European Inventor Award 2012 awarded by European Patent Office for having "made the wireless LAN as fast and powerful as the cabled solutions of the time, and is the basis for the wireless networking technology (Wi-Fi) now used in billions of devices worldwide."   
2012 Fellow of Australian Academy of Technological Sciences and Engineering 
2010 Fellow of Australian Academy of Science
2009 Prime Minister's Prizes for Science
2009 CSIRO Chairman's Medal
2005–present Systems Engineer, CSIRO Australia Telescope National Facility
2004–2006 Lead Signal Processing Architect, G2 Microsystems
2001–2004 Director IC Systems Engineering, Cisco Systems
2000 CSIRO Medal for development and application of fast Fourier transform technology
1999–2001 Vice President Systems Engineering, Radiata Communications
1995–2000 Director Technology, News Ltd
1989–1995 Deputy Chief of Division, CSIRO Radiophysics
1983–1989 Head of Signal Processing Group, CSIRO Radiophysics
1974–1983 Head of Receiver Group, Netherlands Foundation for Radio Astronomy (now ASTRON)

Research highlights
Achieved an eight-fold increase of the bandwidth processing capacity of the Westerbork Radio Telescope as project leader for the digital continuum backend receiver
Participated in a series of innovative experiments to detect exploding black holes and other short time astronomical events
Developed an intellectual underpinning for adaptive optics in light telescopes and redundant baseline interferometer in radio telescopes
With Austek Microsystems created a fast Fourier transform computer chip. This VLSI chip consisted of 160,000 transistors and performed real time transforms at rates up to 2.5 Msamples/s
Influential role in the system design for the Australia Telescope
Led a CSIRO team comprising Graham Daniels, John Deane, Diethelm Ostry, Terry Percival who together invented a patented technology that uses fast Fourier transform and other techniques to enable fast, robust wireless networking in the home and office
Led the system design for the world's first 802.11a (WiFi) chipset developed by Radiata Networks
Over 40 scientific and technical papers at numerous industry conferences
Granted 12 patents in the area of special purpose FFT processors, Wireless LANs and antennas
Member of the Institute of Electrical and Electronics Engineers and Institute of Engineers Australia
Member of international review committee for information and communications technologies in CSIRO
Member of Australian Square Kilometre Array Consultative Committee
Chair of the Mathematics, Information and Communication Sciences Expert Advisory Committee, Convenor ICT Appraisal committee, 2004 CRC selection round
Optical Society of America
Board Director AAPT, Taggle Systems

References

External links
CSIRO 2009 Chairman's Medal award citation
CSIRO’s achievements: Wireless LAN
 Australia and New Zealand’s proposed Square Kilometre Array telescope

Australian electrical engineers
CSIRO people
Living people
University of Sydney alumni
Recipients of the M. A. Sargent Medal
Year of birth missing (living people)